Manchester is a city in Northwest England.  The M40 postcode area is to the northeast of the city centre, and includes parts of the districts of Miles Platting, Clayton, and Moston.  This postcode area contains 13 listed buildings that are recorded in the National Heritage List for England.  Of these, one is listed at Grade II*, the middle of the three grades, and the others are at Grade II, the lowest grade.  The area is partly industrial and partly residential.  Until the Industrial Revolution, it was rural and one listed building, Hough Hall, has survived from this time.  The industrial buildings are textile mills, some of which have been converted for other uses.  The area includes Phillips Park Cemetery, and four structures associated with it are included in the list.  The other listed buildings are churches and associated structures.


Key

Buildings

References

Citations

Sources

Lists of listed buildings in Greater Manchester
Buildings and structures in Manchester